NATO reporting name/ASCC names for transport aircraft and their Soviet, Russian and Chinese designations:

See also
NATO reporting name

transport aircraft
NATO reporting names for transport aircraft, List of